Thoughts Are Thought is Swift's debut album, released in 1999 on Blackbird Productions, and was rereleased in 2003 through Tribunal Records. It was re-released with bonus content on an enhanced CD featuring the video for the song "Titanic".

Track listing
"Diamond" – 4:27
"Titanic" – 3:38
"Younge" – 3:32
"Perhaps" – 3:36
"Why" – 3:23
"Swell Guy" – 3:12
"Whack It" – 3:20
"Feminine" – 3:45
"Enjoy the Silence" (Depeche Mode Cover) – 12:02

Credits
 Gary Forsyth - vocals
 Mikey Gentle - guitar
 Billy Deal - bass
 Jamie King - drums

Swift (band) albums
1999 debut albums